Le Miroir à deux faces is a 1958 French drama film directed by André Cayatte who co-wrote screenplay with Gérard Oury, Jean Meckert and Denis Perret. The film stars Michèle Morgan, Bourvil and Ivan Desny. It was called The Mirror Has Two Faces in English, but this is not the literal translation; the word is à ("with") not a ("has"), and so would be better translated as The Two-Sided Mirror.

The film was loosely remade in the U.S. as The Mirror Has Two Faces (1996) adapted by Richard LaGravenese, and starring Barbra Streisand and Jeff Bridges.

Synopsis
Pierre Tardivet, a professor, marries Marie-José Vauzange, a sensitive and intelligent girl who is physically unattractive. Tardivet soon begins to treat Marie-José cruelly, making her life very unpleasant and joyless. Two children are born from the marriage. Then, Tardivet suffers a car accident and is tended by Dr. Bosc, a famous plastic surgeon. Bosc operates on Marie-José and transforms her into a beautiful woman. Tardivet then begins to treat her even more cruelly. He becomes embittered and hateful towards Marie-José because her changed appearance makes him think she is no longer his. Marie-José and her sister's husband, Gérard Durieu, want to elope and restart their lives, but they are stopped when Pierre Tardivet kills Dr. Bosc. This dramatic act recalls Marie-José to her duties as a wife and mother, and she renounces her happiness to tend to her husband and children.

Cast
Michèle Morgan  - Marie-José
Bourvil  - Tardivet  
Ivan Desny  - Gérard
Elizabeth Manet  - Véronique
Gérard Oury  - Dr. Bosc  
Sandra Milo  - Ariane  
Georgette Anys  - Mme. Benoit  
Julien Carette  - M. Benoit  
Georges Chamarat  - M. Vauzanges  
Jane Marken  - Mme. Vauzanges  
Sylvie  - Mme. Tardivet

Critical reception
Time Out wrote: "Interesting to re-view this in the light of the Streisand 'remake', though any resemblance are so superficial as to appear coincidental," and added that "Cayatte shows his customary relish for the unpleasant: the nightmare honeymoon in Venice is richly detailed and Sylvie sketches in the quietly venomous mother-in-law with her usual economy. If Streisand's film was quintessential '90s Hollywood feel good, this is equally characteristic '50s French astringency." TV Guide commented: "The filmmakers do a fine job of delving into the problems people face when a fairy tale-like transformation takes place, though the film suffers from an over-analysis of the situation. Also, Morgan is too glamorous to pull off the type of physical transformation that occurs."

References

External links
Le Miroir a deux faces at Films de France
Le Miroir a deux faces at Alice Cineme

1958 films
Films directed by André Cayatte
French drama films
1950s French-language films
1950s French films